The Bitlock is a brand of bicycle lock for securing a bicycle to a pole or other fixture, similar to a standard U-lock but it also incorporates a smartlock that can be activated via bluetooth with a smartphone.

Bitlock specifically, and bluetooth-based locking systems in general, have been criticized for being too easy to hack. In August 2016, Tom's Guide reported that researches had found a vulnerability in the lock which they had reported to the company, but remained unpatched six months later. 

Bitlock was initially funding through Kickstarter in 2013 for delivery in 2014, but manufacturing problems delayed delivery.

References

External links 

Locks (security device)
Cycling equipment
Kickstarter-funded products